Grand River Academy, formerly known as the Ashtabula County Institute of Science and Industry and then the Grand River Institute, is a private, nonsectarian, boarding high school for young men located in Austinburg, Ohio. It serves students in grades eight through twelve, with a post-graduate option.

History
The Grand River Institute, originally named the Ashtabula County Institute of Science and Industry, was founded in 1831 by a group of prominent leaders from the Austinburg Congregational Church. The school was initially intended to prepare young men for ministerial vocations, but in 1840, it began to admit female students. Betsy Mix Cowles was appointed as the school's first female principal in charge of the Women's Department, a post she held from 1843-1848. The institution's name and location changed in 1836 at the behest of Joab Austin, a wealthy citizen who pledged a sizeable endowment for the school.

Curriculum 
The school admits boys who may not be reaching their full potential in a traditional high school environment for a variety of reasons. It teaches in small classes and boasts many unique programs, such as the Foundations Learning Program where students learn how they best learn and manage time to succeed in the classroom, and newly introduced The Productive Growth Center.

In order to graduate, students must obtain 21 units of credit. In addition, all seniors must be accepted by an accredited college prior to graduation. Students have been accepted at 75 different colleges.

Grand River is accredited by the Ohio Department of Education, North Central Association Commission on Accreditation and the Independent Schools Association of the Central States.

Extracurricular activities

Athletics
As a member of the Lake Effect Conference, GRA offers a full range of athletic programs, consisting of 9 varsity, 4 junior varsity, and 1 club team.

Fall Sports
Soccer (V, JV)
Golf (V)
Cross country (V)

Winter Sports
Basketball (V, JV)
Bowling (V)
Indoor soccer (club)
Wrestling (V)

Spring Sports
Baseball (V, JV)
Tennis (V, JV)
Lacrosse (V)\

Campus 

In addition to classroom and sports facilities, the school has a gymnasium, the Robert Morrison Lecture Center, and Bud Field Student Center. Students are accommodated in one of five dormitories: Shepard Hall, Mastin Hall, West Hall, North Hall, and Warren Hall.

Notable alumni

Politics, government and law
 Clarence E. Allen, U.S. Representative from Utah
 John Brown, Jr., eldest son of abolitionist John Brown, member of the Kansas Territory legislature.
 Julius C. Burrows, U.S. Representative and a U.S. Senator from Michigan
 Theodore Elijah Burton, U.S. Representative and U.S. Senator
 Edwin Cowles, publisher of The Cleveland Leader, Vice-President of the 1884 Republican National Convention, postmaster of Cleveland
 Albert Gallatin Egbert, Democratic U.S. Representative from Pennsylvania.
 Alphonso Hart, U.S. Representative from Ohio
 Ralph Hill, U.S. Representative from Indiana and lawyer.
 John Philo Hoyt, American politician and jurist
 Elbert L. Lampson, Lieutenant Governor of Ohio and former state Senator

Business
 Alfred Cowles, American economist, businessman and founder of the Cowles Commission
 Benjamin Goodrich, American industrialist, founded BF Goodrich

Notable staff
 Betsy Mix Cowles, an American abolitionist

References

External links
 
 The Association of Boarding Schools profile

Boys' schools in the United States
Boys' schools in Ohio
Educational institutions established in 1831
Boarding schools in Ohio
High schools in Ashtabula County, Ohio
Private high schools in Ohio
1831 establishments in Ohio